The Serpent Only Lies is the eleventh studio album by the American sludge metal band Crowbar. It was released on October 28, 2016, through eOne Music.

Track listing

Personnel

Crowbar
 Kirk Windstein – vocals, rhythm guitar, bass
 Matt Brunson – lead guitar
 Tommy Buckley – drums

Technical personnel
 Kirk Windstein – production
 Duane Simoneaux – production, mixing

References

Crowbar (American band) albums
2016 albums
E1 Music albums